is a Japanese mystery manga series based on the crime solving adventures of a high school student, Hajime Kindaichi, the supposed grandson of the famous (fictional) private detective Kosuke Kindaichi. Written by Yōzaburō Kanari or Seimaru Amagi (depending on series) and illustrated by Fumiya Satō, the Kindaichi series was serialized in Kodansha's shōnen manga magazine Weekly Shōnen Magazine from October 1992 to October 2017, spanning a total of 76 tankōbon volumes. It is one of the earliest works in the mystery manga genre. In North America, the series was published in English by Tokyopop with the title The Kindaichi Case Files. Only the first 17 volumes (the first series) were released by Tokyopop.

The series was adapted by Toei Animation into a feature film in 1996 and a 148-episode anime television series broadcast from 1997 to 2000. The series was also adapted into a live-action film, five live-action drama series, three live-action television specials and further animated features for cinema and television. A second 47-episode anime television series adaptation, titled The Kindaichi Case Files R (Returns), was broadcast from 2014 to 2016.

Another manga series, 37 Year Old Kindaichi Case Files, was serialized in Kodansha's seinen manga magazine Evening from January 2018 to February 2023, and is set to continue on Comic Days manga app. It is set 20 years later, in which Hajime graduates high school, and becomes a manager of a PR firm, but is swung back into mysteries, despite quitting detective work.

In 1995, The Kindaichi Case Files won the 19th Kodansha Manga Award for shōnen. By June 2019, the manga had over 100 million copies in circulation, making it one of the best-selling manga series.

Overview
Kindaichi mysteries are whodunnit stories featuring (usually multiple) gruesome murders, often with a supernatural tinge. Frequently features a locked room mystery or other crimes, such as a murder occurring when all surviving suspects have (apparently) airtight alibis.

A notable distinction of The Kindaichi Case Files is that the killers are not depicted as psychopathic murderers and the murders are never committed for financial reasons alone. The identified killers all have deep rooted problems, often involving great emotional trauma through the greed or thoughtlessness of others, as their reasons for committing the murder(s). Thus the killers are often portrayed as sympathetic figures, as opposed to cold, calculating killers in some other mystery series.

In addition to this, after being revealed the criminal usually attempts suicide.

Characters

17-year-old Fudo High School student Hajime Kindaichi is unmotivated, lazy, and a little lecherous, much to the exasperation of childhood friend Miyuki Nanase. However, only a few people see his great intelligence and deductive prowess by his 180 IQ, possibly inherited from his grandfather, private detective Kosuke Kindaichi. He is also an accomplished sleight of hand artist. Despite his clumsiness and myriad other flaws, he is a loyal friend and a first-rate detective.
20 years later, he became a PR firm manager, quitting detective work. But crimes never retire. So he was stuck into a case he solved many years ago.

The childhood best friend and next door neighbor of Hajime; many question why a model student like Miyuki is friends with a slacker like him. Deep down inside, Miyuki feels Hajime is not an idiot, and they seem to have a love that neither has yet fully expressed. She possesses remarkable logic and perception, although she is obviously not as gifted as he is. Miyuki is the president of Fudo High's student council.
20 years later, she became a flight attendant. She connects to Hajime via cellphone.
 

A Tokyo homicide police inspector who met Kindaichi on his first case, and was so impressed that he has lent the youngster his unquestioning support ever since. He is often the investigating officer on Kindaichi's cases, and provides the official stamp of approval Kindaichi often needs to pursue his investigations. He believes fully in Kindaichi's ability.
20 years later, he retired, but had contact with Hajime.
 

An extremely intelligent, elite-level police detective (superintendent), who is Kenmochi's supervisor. He is an arrogant and snobbish character that becomes a rival to Kindaichi in crime-solving. However, Akechi (indeliberately) not only helped Kindaichi solve the case, but also aided him out of trouble. His relationship to Kindaichi is abrasive at the least, but they have an unspoken mutual respect for each other's abilities. He often compares the crimes in Japan to his experience in Los Angeles. He is proficient in English and French.
20 years later, he became a Police Commissioner.
  

He is obsessed with filming through a V8 camera. He basically shoots everywhere at any time. His tape helped Kindaichi solve the case. In "The Santa Slayings", his tape recorded a critical piece of evidence and he was killed for this. In "Kindaichi the Killer", his younger brother, Ryuji Saki, who very much resembled his elder brother, approached Kindaichi at a party, telling him his elder brother told him in a dream that Kindaichi would be in trouble. Soon after, Ryuji helped Kindaichi avoid a murder trap. Afterwards, Ryuji claims himself as Kindaichi's assistant and sometimes really helps Kindaichi in solving cases. In the anime series, Ryuta survived the attack in "The Santa Slayings" story arc and Ryuji did not appear later on.

Portrayed by: Emiri Nakayama (1995), Wakana Sakai (2001)
A famous actress and singer, first appearing in "Death TV", who initially appeared to be arrogant but turned out to be weak and desperate for protection. After this case, Reika has had a crush on Kindaichi and sent her only Valentine's Day gift, a heart-shaped chocolate, to him without revealing her name. Since then, she and Miyuki seem to be rivals over Kindaichi. In "Playing the Fool", Reika's past, that even she lost memory of, was revealed. In "Reika's Kidnapping", it was revealed that Reika's real mother is veteran actress Keiko Mitamura, but throughout the series Reika never knew it, and it was a secret that only Keiko and Kindaichi know.
20 years later, she retired, married, has a son and is a florist.

Kindaichi's cousin. First appeared in "Saint Valentine's Murders" in manga and "The Undying Butterflies" in the anime television series, and later became a regular character appearing in the majority of cases for an extended period. Fumi has good reasoning skills (although not as good as Kindaichi), she even solves a few mysteries on her own. She sometimes pokes fun at Kindaichi when nobody else is around. Inspector Kenmochi nicknames her "Chibikin" (meaning little Kindaichi).
20 years later, she became a mystery novelist (using cases from Hajime's young days), works at a detective agency and no longer has pigtails.

He is known to be extremely intelligent, considers himself to be the evil twin of Kindaichi, and describes their relationship as parallel lines. He is the only son of Reiko Chikamiya, an internationally known magician, who in turn drove Takato to be a magician himself. What he uncovered about the murder of his mother triggered what he is today. A twisted, cold-hearted magician who considers his devilish setups for the perfect crime as masterpieces, and tolerates no mistakes from the people he uses as his puppets.
20 years later, he called the trio on his cell.

Media

Manga

The Kindaichi Case Files is written by Yōzaburō Kanari (File and Case series) and Seimaru Amagi (other series) and illustrated by Fumiya Satō. The series ran 25 years in Kodansha's shōnen manga magazine Weekly Shōnen Magazine from October 28, 1992, to October 18, 2017.

In North America, Tokyopop licensed the series in 2003. 17 volumes have been published in North America from October 6, 2003, to May 13, 2008, before Tokyopop ceased the series' publication in July 2008.

Another series, titled , set 20 years later, started in Kodansha's seinen manga magazine Evening on January 23, 2018. In January 2022, it was announced that the series would enter on hiatus. Evening ceased its publication on February 28, 2023, and the series will continue on Comic Days manga app. The first tankōbon volume was released on June 15, 2018. As of June 22, 2022, thirteen tankōbon volumes have been released.

Another series, titled , was serialized in Evening from January 11, 2022, to February 28, 2023, ending in the magazine's final issue. The first tankōbon volume was released on May 23, 2022. As of January 23, 2023, three volumes have been released.

Other series
 was published in Weekly Shōnen Magazine between 1998 and 2000, and compiled into two tankōbon volumes.

 started on Manga Box app in 2013 and finished in 2014. Its chapters were collected in a single tankōbon volume, published on May 9, 2014.

A spin-off manga illustrated by Awabako, titled , was published on Manga Box from April 23, 2014, to December 7, 2016. Its chapters were collected in three tankōbon volumes released from September 17, 2014, to December 9, 2016.

, written and illustrated by Shinpei Funatsu, was published on Magazine Pocket app from July 4, 2017, to March 25, 2020; the series had a "revival" serialization, titled  from March 2 to May 11, 2022. Its chapters were collected in eleven tankōbon volumes released from November 17, 2017, June 16, 2022.

A 4-panel comedy spin-off manga, titled  was serialized in Evening from December 28, 2021, to February 28, 2023.

Light novels

The novels were written by Seimaru Amagi and illustrated by Fumiya Satō. 9 volumes were released in Japan between September 22, 1994 and April 20, 2001.

Anime
 
Produced by Toei Animation and directed by Daisuke Nishio, the anime adaptation of the original manga aired on Nippon Television between April 7, 1997 and September 11, 2000, spanning 148 episodes plus one special episode. In addition, two animated films were released on December 14, 1996 and August 21, 1999 respectively. Seven years after the conclusion of the TV anime, two new animated episodes were aired in Japan on November 12, 2007 and November 19, 2007 respectively.

On April 6, 2007, DVD collector's box of Kindaichi was released by Warner Home Video to mark the 10th anniversary of airing of the original TV anime.

The series aired on Animax Asia as The File of Young Kindaichi in Japanese with English subtitles.

To celebrate the 20th Anniversary of the series, two special episodes based on "The Black Magic Murders" were released on DVDs in November 2012 and February 2013.

A revival of the anime television series, The File of Young Kindaichi Returns aired from April 5 to 27 September 2014. A second season aired from October 3, 2015 to March 26, 2016. They were streamed on Crunchyroll during their original broadcast.

Video games
7 Kindaichi video games were released as of September 17, 2009. All of them were released in Japan only. Many of the game voice actors differ from those in the anime version.

CD books
Kodansha released two CD books in 1996 and 1997 respectively. Both have been made into anime. However, nearly all CD books voice actors are not the same as those in the anime version.

Live action film and series
NTV aired five live action series in 1995, 1996, 2001, 2014, and 2022. Specials were aired in 2005, 2013, and 2014.

In the first adaptation, Tsuyoshi Dōmoto of Kinki Kids and Rie Tomosaka starred as Hajime Kindaichi and Miyuki Nanase for two seasons. They also starred in a live action film entitled Shanghai Mermaid Legend Murder Case, directed by Yukihiko Tsutsumi, released on December 13, 1997 in Japan, adaptated from the Kindaichi novel of the same title.

In the second adaptation, Jun Matsumoto of Arashi starred as Hajime Kindaichi, with Suzuki Anne as Miyuki Nanase.

In the third adaptation in 2005, a special based on "The Legendary Vampire Murders" was aired featuring Kazuya Kamenashi of KAT-TUN and Ueno Juri as Kindaichi and Miyuki Nanase.

In the fourth adaptation, Hey! Say! JUMP's Ryosuke Yamada starred as Hajime Kindaichi, while Haruna Kawaguchi portrayed Miyuki Nanase. In 2013, a special based on Hong Kong Kowloon Treasure Murder Case was aired, featuring Yamada and fellow JUMP member Daiki Arioka, with Haruna Kawaguchi, Vivian Hsu, Eric Tsang, Big Bang member Seungri, Rookies actor Kenta Kiritani and Taiwanese actor Chun Wu (Japanese voice dubber was Daisuke Namikawa, Jellal from Fairy Tail). In 2014, a special based on Gate of Jail Private School Murder Case aired, also featuring Yamada. Wu (Japanese voice dubber was Hiroki Touchi) and Kawaguchi, who appeared in the previous special, were also included, as well as 2PM's Nichkhun.

In the fifth adaptation in 2022, Shunsuke Michieda of Naniwa Danshi starred as Hajime Kindaichi, and Moka Kamishiraishi portrayed Miyuki Nanase.

Detective Conan & Kindaichi

In celebration of the 50th anniversary of Weekly Shōnen Sunday and Weekly Shōnen Magazine, the two magazines collaborated to publish twelve biweekly magazines consisting of chapters from Weekly Shōnen Sundays Case Closed and Weekly Shōnen Magazines The Kindaichi Case Files. The magazine ran between April 10, 2008 and September 25, 2008.

Reception

By February 2012, the manga had over 90 million copies in circulation. By June 2019, it had over 100 million copies in circulation. Kindaichi tankōbon were ranked 2nd and 3rd in a Japanese Comic Ranking in October, 2009.

In 1995, the manga won the Kodansha Manga Award in the shōnen category.

Allen Divers of Anime News Network said that while The Kindaichi Case Files "presents some whoppers", the series also has mysteries that are very "familiar", calling it "the Japanese version of the Hardy Boys or Nancy Drew". In Manga: The Complete Guide Jason Thompson described the mystery scenarios as "inventive and intricate, offering genuine brain teasers", but criticized the artwork as "bland".

References

External links

 Animax Asia website
 Tokyopop manga website
 Kindaichi 20th anniversary website
 Toei Animation's Kindaichi website
 Yomiuri TV's Kindaichi R website
 Toei Animation's Kindaichi R website
 

The Kindaichi Case Files
1992 manga
1994 Japanese novels
1996 anime films
1997 anime television series debuts
1997 films
1999 anime films
2014 anime television series debuts
2015 anime television series debuts
Animated films based on manga
Detective anime and manga
Films directed by Yukihiko Tsutsumi
1990s Japanese-language films
Kodansha manga
Light novels
Live-action films based on manga
Manga adapted into films
Mystery anime and manga
Nippon TV dramas
Seinen manga
Shin Kibayashi
Shōnen manga
Toei Animation films
Toei Animation television
Tokyopop titles
Winner of Kodansha Manga Award (Shōnen)
Yomiuri Telecasting Corporation original programming